Eden, West Virginia may refer to:

Eden, Boone County, West Virginia, an unincorporated community
Eden, Ohio County, West Virginia, an unincorporated community
Eden, Upshur County, West Virginia, an unincorporated community